Subsoil is the layer of soil under the topsoil on the surface of the ground. Like topsoil, it is composed of a variable mixture of small particles such as sand, silt and clay, but with a much lower percentage of organic matter and humus, and it has a small amount of rocks which are smaller mixed with it. The subsoil is also called B Horizon. 

Whereas the topsoil (alternatively called the A horizon) tends to be the site containing the greatest physical, chemical, and biological activity, the subsoil (or the B horizon) is the region of deposition where you can find iron oxide, clay particles, and small amounts of organic material reaching from the A horizon. It is also less weathered than the topsoil. Due to human activity, the topsoil and subsoil in many environments has been mixed together. Below the subsoil is the soil base (or C horizon).

Clay-based subsoil has been the primary source of material for adobe, cob, rammed earth, wattle and daub, and other earthen construction methods for millennia. Coarse sand, the other ingredient in most of these materials, is also found in subsoil.

Although by no means sterile, subsoil is relatively barren in terms of soil organisms compared to humus-rich topsoil.

See also

 Soil
 Soil horizon
 Subgrade
 Parent rock

Sources
  
  

Types of soil